The 2016 Colorado Democratic presidential caucuses took place on March 1 in the U.S. state of Colorado as one of the Democratic Party's primaries ahead of the 2016 presidential election.

On the same day, dubbed "Super Tuesday," Democratic primaries were held in ten other states plus American Samoa, while the Republican Party held primaries in eleven states including their own Colorado caucuses.

Youth and Latino caucus-goers delivered a win for Bernie Sanders.

Opinion polling

Results

Results of the precinct caucus
 Caucus date March 1, 2016

Detailed estimates per congressional district

Results of the county assemblies
 Timeframe for the county assemblies March 2–26, 2016

|-
! rowspan="2" | Candidate
! colspan="2" | State + District delegates
! colspan="3" | Estimated delegates
|-
! style="width:70px;" | Count
! style="width:80px;" | Percentage
! style="width:45px;" | Pledged
! style="width:45px;" | Unpledged
! style="width:45px;" | Total
|- 
| style="text-align:left;" | Bernie Sanders
| 372 || 61.39%
| || || 
|-
| style="text-align:left;"| Hillary Clinton
| 234 || 38.61%
| || || 
|-
| style="text-align:left;"| Uncommitted
| || 
| || || 
|-
! Total
! 606 !! 100%
! !! !! 
|}

Results of the congressional district conventions
Detailed results for the congressional district conventions, 

|-
! rowspan=2 | District
! rowspan=2 style="width:60px;" | Delegatesavailable
! colspan=2 | Delegates won
|-
! style="width:60px;" | Sanders
! style="width:60px;" | Clinton
|-
| style="text-align:left" | 1st district
| 8
| 5
| 3
|-
| style="text-align:left" | 2nd district
| 7
| 4
| 3
|-
| style="text-align:left" | 3rd district
| 6
| 4
| 2
|-
| style="text-align:left" | 4th district
| 5
| 3
| 2
|-
| style="text-align:left" | 5th district
| 5
| 3
| 2
|-
| style="text-align:left" | 6th district
| 6
| 3
| 3
|-
| style="text-align:left" | 7th district
| 6
| 4
| 2
|-
! Total
! style="text-align:right" | 43
! style="text-align:right" | 26
! style="text-align:right" | 17
|}

Results of the state convention
 State convention date April 16, 2016

Analysis
As Barack Obama had similarly done eight years earlier in the state, Bernie Sanders won a convincing 19-point victory in the Colorado caucus, relying on turnout from young adult voters in a majority white electorate. He ran up big margins in the capital city of Denver and in Denver County at large, as well as in Colorado Springs in El Paso County and Fort Collins in Larimer County. Sanders also performed very strongly in the western parts of the state along the Rocky Mountains, in regions such as the Colorado Mineral belt and Northwestern Colorado which are rural and sparsely populated. Clinton won in the city of Pueblo in Pueblo County.

Sanders gained more delegates over Clinton with a large turnout from supporters at the conventions in April.

References

Colorado
Democratic primary
2016